The Joy Thieves is a musical supergroup, consisting of current, former, and touring members of bands such as Ministry, Stabbing Westward, The Rollins Band, Killing Joke, Pigface, Revolting Cocks, <PIG>, David Bowie, Machines of Loving Grace, Marilyn Manson, Depeche Mode, Nine Inch Nails, KMFDM, Naked Raygun, Foetus, My Life with the Thrill Kill Kult, Blue October, Pegboy, Nitzer Ebb, Die Krupps, White Zombie, and many more. The band incorporates elements of industrial, industrial rock, hard rock, alternative, and punk into their music.
Along with their original releases, The Joy Thieves have also done official remixes for many other artists, including Chris Connelly, <PIG>, Consolidated, Drownd, I Ya Toyah, Blue Eyed Christ, Machines With Human Skin, DogTablet, A Covenant of Thorns, Death Pop Radio, Sapphira Vee, Stoneburner, and more.

"Joy Thieves Productions” refers to the audio production team of Dan Milligan and James Scott.

History

Formation and This Will Kill That (2017-2019) 
The Joy Thieves began in December 2017, when Chicago drummer/musician Dan Milligan began assembling a group of musicians to contribute to a new industrial rock recording project. Word of the new “supergroup” began spreading over the course of the next year, as notable musicians Chris Connelly, David Suycott, Howie Beno, Matt Noveskey, Andy Gerold, and Louis Svitek became involved, and there were over 30 contributors before the band had released any music. In early 2019, The Joy Thieves signed a record deal with London's Armalyte Industries.

On May 31, 2019, the band released a music video for the title track of their debut EP, This Will Kill That. Sung by Chris Connelly, he described the song as “a direct reference to Victor Hugo’s prophecy that the printed word would make the church obsolete.” It was also written in response to a series of nightmares that Dan Milligan was having as he was writing music for the EP. This Will Kill That was officially released on June 28, 2019, and it featured appearances by guitarist Andy Gerold, and drummer David Suycott.

Cities In Dust EP (2019) 
On October 4, 2019, The Joy Thieves released their second EP, Cities In Dust, as a free download-only EP on Armalyte Industries. In addition to their remake of the Siouxsie and the Banshees’ song, Cities In Dust, the 6-song EP included remixes of songs from This Will Kill That, with contributions from John Fryer, Howie Beno & Brandt Gassman, and Armalyte Industries label-mates, i! On October 14, 2019, they released the music video for Cities In Dust.

A Blue Girl EP (2020) 
On March 6, 2020, the band released a video for the title track for their third EP release, A Blue Girl, and the EP was released by Armalyte Industries on March 13, 2020. Created by a much larger cast of musicians than their previous two releases, A Blue Girl features appearances by Chris Connelly, Howie Beno, Marcus Eliopulos, Andy Gerold, Matt Noveskey, Julian Beeston, Louis Svitek, and more. The band also released a lyric video for The Badlander (feat. Chris Connelly) on March 27, 2020.

Genocide Love Song single (2020) 
On May 15, 2020, The Joy Thieves released an unannounced single titled Genocide Love Song, as well as an accompanying video for the title song. The single, the video, and the remix were conceived, recorded, mixed, mastered, and released during a single week of the lockdown during the COVID-19 quarantine. The song was written by Dan Milligan and Chris Connelly as a scathing indictment of the government; specifically how their handling of the COVID-19 situation was leading to unnecessary deaths, including the death of Milligan's uncle.)

American Parasite (2021) 
On July 23, 2021, the band released their first full-length album, American Parasite, on Armalyte Industries. Stylistically different from their previous releases, American Parasite finds the band embracing a punk rock sound much more than their previous releases. And instead of having a different vocalist on each track, like their previous releases, all of the lead vocals on American Parasite were done by Chris Connelly. Several new members were inducted into the group during the making of the album, including drummer Paul Ferguson (Killing Joke, Murder Inc, Warrior Soul, The Orb), drummer Joe Haggerty (The Effigies, Pegboy), guitarist John Haggerty (Naked Raygun, Pegboy), guitarist Chris Haskett (The Rollins Band, David Bowie, Foetus), and songwriter Scott-David Allen (A Covenant of Thorns, The Burying Kind).

Disaster Film: The Joy Thieves Live at Populist Studio (2021) 
After several years of existing as only a recording entity, The Joy Thieves created a live version of the band in June 2021 that consisted of Dan Milligan, James Scott, Marcus Eliopulos, Jeff Harris, Matt Clark, Chris Connelly, and Ania Tarnowska. After one rehearsal, the band brought in a video crew and recorded audio and video of five Joy Thieves songs: American Parasite, Drown By Invitation, A Blue Girl, Cities In Dust and Wonder War. The result is Disaster Film: The Joy Thieves Live at Populist Studio; an addendum to American Parasite that was given away free to anyone who purchased American Parasite from the Armalyte Industries' Bandcamp page.

Nemesis single (2021) 
On September 17, 2021, Armalyte Industries released another unannounced single by The Joy Thieves; a free, digital-only cover of the song Nemesis by the band Shriekback. The release included three remixes of the single: Nemesis (Blue Eyed Christ Remix) by John D. Norten, Nemesis (Dark Waters Mix) by Wandering Stars, and Nemesis (Blacklight Mix featuring Carl Marsh) by Sapphira Vee.

6 To 3 EP (2022) 
On November 25, 2022, The Joy Thieves commemorated The International Day for the Elimination of Violence against Women by releasing ‘6 To 3.” The EP was written and recorded as a direct response to the US Supreme Court’s decision to overturn Roe v. Wade in 2022, with the band donating all profits from the album to the National Network of Abortion Funds.. The release featured three new original songs, and remixes by Walter Flakus (Stabbing Westward), Jim Marcus (GoFight / Die Warzau), Steven Archer (Stoneburner / Ego Likeness), and Eva X.

Members 
The Joy Thieves are an ever-growing, ever-changing collective of musicians. The following is a partial list of members, along with a list of some of the other musical projects in which they have been involved.
 Scott-David Allen (A Covenant of Thorns, The Burying Kind)
 Steven Archer (Ego Likeness, Stoneburner)
 Dave Bachta (Lovelies Bleeding)
 Julian Beeston (Nitzer Ebb, Cubanate, Bob Marley, Billy Idol, William Orbit, Gravity Kills, BT, Flood)
 Howie Beno (Ministry, Black Asteroid, Silver Relics, Depeche Mode, Red Hot Chili Peppers, Mary's Window, Sheep On Drugs, Skrew, 13MG, Blondie)
 Laura Bienz (Lorelei Dreaming)
 Bradley Bills (Chant, Evil Mothers, Pigface, KMFDM, My Life with the Thrill Kill Kult, Skatenigs, Die Krupps)
 Taylor Busby (Purple)
 Derek Christopher (Wandering Stars)
 Matthew Clark (Mary's Window)
 Chris Connelly (solo artist CC, Finitribe, Revolting Cocks, Ministry, Pigface, Murder, Inc., The Damage Manual, Acid Horse, Cocksure, Bells Into Machines, Everyoned)
 Mike Czarnik (Mary's Window)
 Marcus Eliopulos (Stabbing Westward)
 Eva X
 Walter Flakus (Stabbing Westward, The Dreaming)
 Paul     Ferguson (Killing Joke, Warrior Soul, Murder, Inc.,The Orb)
 Ed Finkler (Dead Agent, Cult of Jester)
 Mia FluxXx (FLUXXX, Featured, Gritty In Pink)
 John Fryer (Black Needle Noise, Nine Inch Nails, Depeche Mode, This Mortal Coil, White Zombie, Stabbing Westward, Gravity Kills, Jesus Jones, Silver Ghost Shimmer, Yaz, Peter Murphy)
 Brandt Gassman (hypefactor)
 Andy Gerold (Marilyn Manson, Ashes Divide, 16Volt,There Is No Us)
 Laura Glyda (solo artist)
 Michael Allen Gould (Spyderbone)
 Lana Guerra (artist, fashion designer, and performer)
 Joe Haggerty (The Effigies, Pegboy)
 John Haggerty (Naked Raygun, Pegboy)
 Cat Hall (Dissonance)
 Adrian Halo (Machines With Human Skin)
 Jeff Harris (Mary's Window, Traveling Sky, Release)
 Chris Haskett (The Rollins Band, David Bowie, Foetus)
 Ryan Henderson (Kady Rain, Cara Van Thorn, Emily Wolfe)
 Katzen Hobbes (The Human Marvels, 999 Eyes Freakshow)
 i! (i!)
 Jane Jensen (solo artist, Oxygiene 23, Martin Bisi, The Dolls)
 Mari Kattman (solo artist,Helix)
 Jason Kottwitz (The Dead Boys)
 Eric Liljehorn: (Death Pop Radio, In Europe Without a Jacket)
 Groovie Mann (My Life With the Thrill Kill Kult,Trash Deity)
 Jim Marcus (GoFight, Die Warzau)
 Geoff Matson (solo artist)
 Jaysun McBain (Murmuur, Traveling Sky, Release)
 Matt Mercado (Mindbomb, Daisy Chain, Supermercado, Pivot Man. Owner of Sonic Palace Recording Studio, Chicago)
 Dan Milligan (Drownbeat, The Burying Kind, Mary's Window)
 Dee J Nelson (Death Pop Radio)
 John D. Norten (Blue Eyed Christ, Trash Deity, Lady Gaga, Prince, Snoop Dogg, Dr. Dre)
 Matt Noveskey (Blue October)
 Phil Owen (Skatenigs)
 Mike Reidy (W.O.R.M: The World Organization of the Righteous Movement)
 Greg Rolfes (eleven12 Design)
 Sapphira Vee (Collapse of Dawn, Venus McVee & Notorious Erich Von P, Blindcopy, Dogtablet)
 Coral Scere (SCERE)
 Destiny Justic Scott (Destiny Scott Design)
 James Scott (She Rides Tigers, Matthew. Owner and head engineer at Populist Recording Studio)
 Gregory Stokes (Wandering Stars)
 Grant Sutton (Jumpsuit, The Party Downers, Monster Trux)
 David Suycott (Stabbing Westward, Machines of Loving Grace, Spies Who Surf, Razorhouse, Verbow)
 Louis Svitek (Ministry, Pigface, Mindfunk, Zoetrope, Project .44)
 Ania Tarnowska (I Ya Toyah)
 Veronica Tam
 Mimi Wallman (ONO, Ampyre, Host Body)
 Worth Steeling (forging sound with fire)
 Raymond Watts (<PIG>, KMFDM)
 Gordon Young (Children On Stun, Dream Disciples, Gary Numan)

Joy Thieves Productions 
In addition to all of the releases for the band, Joy Thieves Productions has done recording, mixing, audio production, remixing and mastering projects with recording artists such as:
 Chris Connelly (solo artist, Finitribe, Revolting Cocks, Ministry, Pigface, Murder, Inc., The Damage Manual, Acid Horse, Cocksure, Bells Into Machines, Everyoned)
 Raymond Watts (<PIG>, KMFDM)
 Groovie Mann (My Life with the Thrill Kill Kult)
 Louis Svitek (Ministry, Pigface, Mindfunk, Zoetrope, Project .44)
 Julian Beeston (Nitzer Ebb, Cubanate, Bob Marley, Billy Idol, William Orbit, Gravity Kills, BT, Flood)
 Mark Pistel (Consolidated, Meat Beat Manifesto, The Disposable Heroes of Hiphoprisy, MC 900 Foot Jesus, Machines of Loving Grace, Grace Jones)
 Carl Marsh (Shriekback)
 Phil Owen (Skatenigs)
 Ania Tarnowska (I Ya Toyah)
 Martin King (Test Dept., DogTablet, Pigface)
 Jared Louche (Chemlab, DogTablet)
 En Esch (KMFDM, Pigface, PIG, Slick Idiot)
 Mea Fisher (Lords of Acid)
 Howie Beno (Ministry, Black Asteroid, Silver Relics, Depeche Mode, Red Hot Chili Peppers, Mary's Window, Sheep On Drugs, Skrew, 13MG, Blondie)
 Gordon Young (Children On Stun, Dream Disciples, Gary Numan)
 David Suycott (Stabbing Westward, Machines of Loving Grace, Spies Who Surf, Razorhouse, Verbow)

Discography

Studio recordings 
 2019: This Will Kill That (Armalyte Industries)
 2019: Cities In Dust (Armalyte Industries)
 2020: A Blue Girl (Armalyte Industries)
 2020: Genocide Love Song (Armalyte Industries)
 2021: American Parasite (Armalyte Industries)
 2021: Nemesis (Armalyte Industries)
 2022: 6 To 3 (Armalyte Industries)

Video releases 
 2021 Disaster Film: The Joy Thieves Live at Populist Studio (Armalyte Industries)

Official remixes for other artists 
 Confession (Feeding the Beast Mix) by <PIG>
 Sick Like You (Smoulder Mix) by Drownd
 Glass Eyes (The Joy Thieves Remix) by I Ya Toyah
 Like a Bomb (Joy Thieves rEmiX) By Death Pop Radio
 Awake (Joy Thieves Remix) by Machines With Human Skin
 The Imposter (Joy Thieves Remix) by Machines With Human Skin
 Picassa (Fantoma Tranquile Remix) by Chris Connelly
 The Sun Is a Maze (M-Descent Remix) by Chris Connelly
 Tail Lights Fading (Tributary Mix) by DogTablet
 Dahlia (Phosphene Dreams Mix) by A Covenant of Thorns
 Capitalism (The Joy Thieves Remix) by Consolidated
 Who (Will I Be) Today (The Joy Thieves Remix) by Sapphira Vee
 Faulted (BIG TALK Mix) by Dead Agent
 Greed (Grab 'Em By The...Mix) (The Joy Thieves Remix) by Sapphira Vee
 Blacklight (3:13AM Mix) by Blindcopy
 Hollow (Dan Milligan Remix) by Dance Loud
 Ledge (The Joy Thieves Rock Remix) by Garek
 Beauty Is Terror (F7 Joy Thieves Remix) by Stoneburner
 The Heart Wants (Joy Thieves Remix) by Sapphira Vee feat. Jim Semonik
 Hell And Back (Ten Feet Tall Remix) by Skatenigs
 Badland(er) (Blowtorch Blues Remix) by PIG X The Joy Thieves
 World On Fire (The Joy Thieves Remix) by Blue Eyed Christ (feat. En Esch and Mea Fisher)
 Hell and Back (Ten Feet Tall Remix) by Skatenigs
 Drowning In the Past (The Joy Thieves Mix) by .SYS Machine
 5 Broken Straws (LA Remix) by Dogtablet (feat. Groovie Mann)
 What I Say (MaGenTa Mix) by The Blue Hour (feat. Mark Gemini Thwaite)
 Into the Sun (Coronal Loops Mix) by Sword Tongue
 Vast Spaces (The Joy Thieves Remix) by I Ya Toyah
 Starter (The Joy Thieves Remix) by Newphasemusic
 Spavaj (Dan Milligan Remix) by Mokosh
 Headhunter (Lock the Tarrrrrrget Mix) by La Muerte feat. Richard 23 & Patrick Codenys (Front 242)
 Unhappily Ever Now (The Joy Thieves Remix) by Unhappily Ever Now
 Check Out Your Mind (The Joy Thieves RMX) by The Veldt
 Whispering Wandering Struggling (The Joy Thieves Remix) by Unhappily Ever Now
 The Way It Goes (Axcs Of Basxs Mix) by Wandering Stars
 Out of Control (Nothing Left to Say - The Joy Thieves remix) by Amulet
 Aboulia - Joy Thieves Remix by Manticore Kiss
 Fashion Bi Evol (Killiope Inside of Me Mix by The Joy Thieves) by Darling Kandie
 Deaf Blood (Exploit the Moment Mix) by Derision Cult feat. Chris Connelly and Reeves Gabrels

Compilations 
 Tiny Gods Who Walk Beside Us
 Tear Down The Walls: A Riveting Tribute To Pink Floyd's The Wall (Riveting Music)
 The Unquiet Grave 2020 (Cleopatra Records)
 Mind over Metal - Volume 2 (Cave Dweller Music)
 Black is the New Black: The Power & Privilege Industrial Culture Compilation (Furnace Records)
 Broken Hearts & Robot Parts, Volume II (COP International)
 Armalyte XX (Armalyte Industries)
 Follow the Leaders: A Killing Joke Tribute (Coitus Interruptus Productions)
 Regulate This: A Riveting Tribute to Girl Power (Riveting Music)

See also 
 post-industrial

References

External links 
 

Musical groups established in 2017
2017 establishments in Illinois